Treaty City Titans are an Irish semi-professional rugby league team based in Limerick, Ireland. They play in the Munster Conference of the Irish Elite League. They play their matches at Tom Clifford Park.

History

Elite League Seasons
It was in the first season that they won the Elite League winning all of their main eight games along with beating the Carlow Crusaders 24-10 in the Grand Final.

In the 2007 season they became champions again. Out of the ten matches played they won eight and drew only twice, both to the Carlow Crusaders. The first match in June, finished at 22 points each and then in August they drew 0-0. In a repeat to last season, the Grand Final was between the Titans and the Crusaders. The Titans won 38-22 at Old Crescent R.F.C.

In July 2007 the Sky Sports programme Boots'N'All visited Limerick to record a piece on Rugby League in Ireland. The Titans played a friendly match with their "A" team to allow footage to be recorded.

In November, for the Ireland Wolfhounds important match over Russia, to allow entry into the 2008 Rugby League World Cup, three Titans players: Michael "Mike" Brodie, Billy Treacy and Kevin O'Riordan, were selected in the team. They eventually won 58-18 and clinched a place in the World Cup. The same players are expected to feature in that tournament alongside Irish Super League players.

The side won the 2009  Irish Elite League.

Current squad

Honours
 Irish Elite League (8): 2005, 2006, 2007, 2009, 2010, 2011, 2013, 2015
Runners-up (2): 2008, 2014
 Munster League (4): 2011, 2013, 2014, 2015
Runners-up (1): 2012

References

External links
 RLI Munster clubs

Irish rugby league teams
Sport in County Limerick
Rugby clubs established in 2005
2005 establishments in Ireland